Halloween Rain is an original novel based on the U.S. television series Buffy the Vampire Slayer.

Plot summary
Xander and Willow warn Buffy not to go out on Halloween if it's raining. According to the premise of the book, the rain in Sunnydale is magical on Halloween, and if it lands on a scarecrow it will animate and hunt down the Slayer. While at a Halloween party at the Bronze, Buffy is forced to go to the cemetery to fight vampires. She eventually encounters the reanimated scarecrow.

Continuity
This novel is meant to take place between the episodes "The Pack" and "Angel" in season one.
However, Halloween has already long passed in the show's continuity, making the events in this novel impossible.

Golden revealed in an interview that the book was written before the "Halloween" episode which contradicted elements of the novel Halloween Rain.

Translations 
 Halloween (German) 
 La Pluie d'Halloween (French) 
 Hujan Rain (Indonesian) 
 Il ballo di Halloween (Italian) 
 Halloween (Dutch) 
 Chuva em Dia de Bruxas (Portuguese) 
 死霊の王  (Japanese)

References

External links

Reviews
Slayerlit.us - Review of this book.
Litefoot1969.bravepages.com - Review of this book by Litefoot 
Teen-books.com - Reviews of this book 
Nika-summers.com - Review of this book by Nika Summers
Shadowcat.name - Review of this book

1997 novels
Books based on Buffy the Vampire Slayer
Pocket Books books